Meiacanthus anema, the threadless blenny, is a species of combtooth blenny found in Asia and Oceania.  This species grows to a length of  SL.  This venomous species can also be found in the aquarium trade.

References

anema
Fish of Asia
Fish of Oceania
Fish of the Pacific Ocean
Fish described in 1852